Craiova may refer to the following places in Romania:

 Craiova, a city, capital of Dolj County 
 Craiova (Cerna), a tributary of the Cerna in Caraș-Severin County
 Craiova, another name for the river Globu in Caraș-Severin County